Chou Tzu-yu (born 14 June 1999), known mononymously as Tzuyu, is a Taiwanese singer based in South Korea. She is the youngest and the only Taiwanese member of the girl group Twice, formed by JYP Entertainment in 2015.

Life and career

Early life and pre-debut activities

Tzuyu was born in the East District of Tainan, Taiwan on 14 June 1999 to self-made entrepreneurs. She started dancing from a young age and trained at a dance academy.

In 2012, Tzuyu was discovered by talent scouts at the MUSE Performing Arts Workshop in Tainan, and moved to South Korea in November of that year to begin training. In 2016, she passed an exam at Tainan Municipal Fusing Junior High School to certify her middle school education. She attended high school at Hanlim Multi Art School in South Korea, and graduated in February 2019 along with bandmate Chaeyoung. In 2015, Tzuyu participated in the South Korean reality television show Sixteen, created by JYP Entertainment and co-produced by Mnet. As one of nine successful participants, she went on to join the newly formed girl group Twice. Unlike the other winners of Sixteen, however, Tzuyu was selected based on audience voting.

Endorsements 
Aside from endorsements with Twice, Tzuyu has featured alone in various advertisements, including those for LG U+ and Crocs Korea. She covered the October 2021 issue of L'Officiel Malaysia as a model for the Coach Fall/Winter 2021 collection. In January 2022, Tzuyu was chosen as the new muse of South Korean clothing brand ZOOC. In October 2022, she was announced as the muse of one of Japan's most popular cosmetic brand, Visée.

Public image and influence

In October 2015, Tzuyu officially debuted as a member of Twice with the release of their first extended play, The Story Begins. Its lead single "Like Ooh-Ahh" was the first K-pop debut song to reach 100 million views on YouTube. Since her debut, she has also worked as a presenter on multiple music television shows and received attention for her beauty. 

According to Gallup Korea's annual music survey, Tzuyu was the third most popular idol among South Koreans in 2016. She ranked ninth in the 2017 survey and twelfth in 2018. In 2019, Tzuyu was ranked as the second most popular female K-pop idol in a survey of soldiers completing mandatory military service in South Korea.

Flag controversy

In November 2015, Tzuyu appeared with bandmates Sana, Momo, and Mina on the Korean variety show My Little Television. She introduced herself as Taiwanese and held the flag of the Republic of China (Taiwan) alongside that of South Korea. Mainland Chinese internet users reacted angrily towards Tzuyu's actions due to the political rift between the two countries. Soon after, Twice was barred from Chinese television and Tzuyu was pulled out of her endorsement with Chinese communications company Huawei. Meanwhile, her agency, JYP Entertainment, released a video showing Tzuyu reading an apology, which said in part:

Tzuyu's apology sparked a furor among the Taiwanese public on election day. The incident gained international attention, as it was believed to have affected the 2016 Taiwanese general election. A survey found that Tzuyu's video apology affected the decision of about 1.34 million young voters.

In response to criticism, JYP Entertainment announced that it would be adopting new procedures concerning its exports and overseas activities in order to protect employees from future controversies. This included the implementation of cultural sensitivity training for its artists and staff members. In an interview with The Korea Times, a JYP representative stated that the training would include issues pertaining to political conflicts between countries.

Discography

Songwriting credits
All song credits are adapted from the Korea Music Copyright Association's database unless stated otherwise.

Filmography

Television shows

Bibliography

Photobooks

References

External links

 

1999 births
Living people
Hanlim Multi Art School alumni
Japanese-language singers of Taiwan
JYP Entertainment artists
K-pop singers
Korean-language singers of Taiwan
Musicians from Tainan
Reality show winners
Child singers
Taiwanese dance musicians
Taiwanese expatriates in South Korea
21st-century Taiwanese women singers
Taiwanese idols
Taiwanese pop singers
Twice (group) members